The Taehwa River flows into Ulsan Bay. The river's entire 46-kilometer course lies within the metropolitan city of Ulsan.  The Taehwa drains an area of nearly 645 km²; much of this lies within Ulsan, but portions of it lie in neighboring cities such as Gyeongju.

See also
List of rivers of Asia
Rivers of Korea
Geography of South Korea

References

External links

Rivers of South Korea
Geography of Ulsan
Tourist attractions in Ulsan